, stylized GILLE, is a Japanese singer originally from Saito, Miyazaki. She made her major debut in 2012, but had previously performed under the name TASHA gee. Gille made a name for herself by releasing videos of herself singing English language covers of Japanese pop songs on her YouTube channel appearing only in silhouette, including some English songs such as "Rolling in the Deep", featured on her debut EP Lead the Way. In June 2012, she released an English cover of AKB48's "Flying Get", and the group's creator Yasushi Akimoto remarked that Gille had a "diamond voice" and fully approved the cover. Gille made her debut with the album I AM GILLE. in July 2012, which eventually became certified as gold. Her debut single "Girls / Winter Dream" was released that October, and was noted to sample O-Zone's "Dragostea Din Tei". This was followed up by the single "Try Again" in January 2013 and the album GILLEsound Vol. 1.

Discography

As TASHA gee
Singles
"WILL" – July 24, 2011
 – May 30, 2012

As GILLE
EPs
Lead the Way – May 16, 2012

Albums
I AM GILLE. – July 18, 2012
I AM GILLE. -Special Edition- – September 26, 2012
GILLEsound Vol.1 – March 6, 2013
I AM GILLE. 2 – September 4, 2013
I AM GILLE. -Best Selection +- – January 15, 2014
REAL - March 2, 2016

Singles
"GIRLS / Winter Dream" – October 24, 2012
"Try Again" – January 30, 2013
"HIKARI" – August 21, 2013

Digital singles
 – April 18, 2012
 – May 16, 2012
"Party Rock Anthem feat. Steve Jay" (originally by LMFAO) – June 6, 2012
 – June 6, 2012
 – June 27, 2012
 – February 20, 2013
 – July 24, 2013
 – August 14, 2013
"Smile Again" – October 9, 2013

References

External links
 at Universal Music Japan

1987 births
Living people
People from Miyazaki Prefecture
Universal Music Japan artists
Musicians from Miyazaki Prefecture
English-language singers from Japan
21st-century Japanese singers
21st-century Japanese women singers